Rudolf Wertz (born in Vienna; died 1966) was a physician from Vienna, who received the honorary title "Righteous among the Nations" as Austrian.

In 1941, Werzt rescued Jews from deportation to Poland by issuing confirmations of serious diseases for them.

One of the rescued was the Jew Gertrude Fritz, who, by arriving at Wertz already was referenced on a deportation list. Wertz certified her an abscess in her uterus and ordered her six weeks of bed rest. There were some Gestapo-physicians who came to her, but they believed the sickness certificate would be correct. During this time Gertrude Fritz was not deported.

Later, the Gestapo discovered Wertz' relief operation and he was convicted to a punishment battalion. He was not exempted till end of war and still lived till 1966.

External links
 Rudolf Wertz – his activity to save Jews' lives during the Holocaust, at Yad Vashem website

1966 deaths
Austrian Righteous Among the Nations
People from Vienna in health professions
Physicians from Vienna
Year of birth missing